Benjamin Bowring (baptised 17 May 1778 – 1 June 1846) was an English watchmaker, jeweller, and businessman. He was the founder, in 1811, of the Bowring trading, shipping and insurance businesses, later known as Bowring Brothers in Canada and the United States, and C.T. Bowring & Co. in the United Kingdom and elsewhere. In 1979, the MV Benjamin Bowring was named after him. C.T. Bowring and Co. was bought by Marsh & McLennan Companies in 1980.

References

 
 
 
 

1778 births
1846 deaths
19th-century English businesspeople
English clockmakers
English watchmakers (people)
English Dissenters
Businesspeople from Exeter
Pre-Confederation Canadian businesspeople
Businesspeople from Newfoundland and Labrador
British emigrants to Canada
Newfoundland Colony people
People from Newfoundland (island)
Canadian merchants
Bowring Brothers